Ad hoc is a Latin phrase meaning "to this". 

Ad hoc or Ad Hoc may also refer to:

 Ad Hoc at Home, a 2009 cookbook by Thomas Keller and Dave Cruz
 Ad hoc hypothesis, a sometimes dubious method of dealing with anomalies in philosophy and science
 Ad hoc network, a type of technology which allow network communications on an ad hoc basis
 Ad Hoc (restaurant), a restaurant in Yountville, California
 ADHOC, the Cambodian Human Rights and Development Association, Cambodia's oldest human rights NGO